Lil Me is the debut mixtape by American rapper Wiki. It was released on December 7, 2015, by Letter Racer Records. The mixtape features guest appearances from his Ratking cohorts Hak and Sporting Life, as well as Skepta, Antwon, Micachu, and Nasty Nigel, among others. The mixtape is supported by three singles, "Livin' with My Moms", "Patience", and "3 Stories".

Background 
Wiki considers Lil Me to be his first "official solo project".

Release and promotion 
On November 30, 2015, the lead single "Livin' with My Moms" was released along with a supporting music video. On January 8, 2016, the deluxe edition of Lil Me was released digitally. It included the mixtape as well as lyrics, a digital booklet, a music video for the track "Crib Tax", and a bonus track "Hate is Earned" produced by Black Milk. On February 9, 2016, a music video for "Patience" was released. On March 18, 2016 a remix for the track "God Bless Me" featuring an additional verse from Antwon was released. On June 8, 2016, a music video for "3 Stories" was released.

Track listing 

 Notes
 "Crib Tax" contains uncredited vocals from Shawn Powers.
 "Sonatine" contains uncredited vocals from Nick Hakim.

Personnel 

 Andrew Kass - artwork
 Antwon - featured artist, vocals
 Benamin - mixing, arrangements, congas
 Black Mack - producer
 Black Milk - producer
 Black Noi$e - producer
 Daddy Kev - mastering
 Dev Hynes - bass guitar
 DJ Lucas - producer
 Hak - featured artist, vocals
 Harry Fraud - producer, mixing, recording engineer
 Isaac Sleator - synthesizer
 Isaiah Barr - producer, piano, saxophone
 Jadasea - featured artist, vocals
 Jesse James Solomon - featured artist, vocals
 Kaytranada - producer
 King Krule - guitar
 Lee Bannon - producer
 Madlib - producer
 Matt Lubanksy - executive producer
 Micachu - featured artist, vocals, producer
 Nasty Nigel - featured artist, vocals
 Nick Hakim - background vocals
 Shawn Powers - background vocals
 Skepta - featured artist, vocals
 SKYWLKR - producer
 Sporting Life - executive producer, featured artist, vocals, producer
 Wiki - primary artist, vocals
 Yung Gutted - producer

References

External links 
 

2015 mixtape albums
Debut mixtape albums
Albums produced by Fred Warmsley
Hip hop albums by American artists